The 2020 California Proposition 17 is a ballot measure that appeared on the ballot in the 2020 California elections on November 3. Prop 17 amended the Constitution of California to allow people who are on parole to vote. Due to the passage of this proposition, more than 50,000 people in California who are currently on parole and have completed their prison sentence are now eligible to vote and to run for public office. This proposition also provides that all those on parole in the future will be allowed to vote  and run for public office as well. The work of Proposition 17 comes out of a history of addressing felony disenfranchisement in the United States. California voters approved this measured by a margin of roughly 18 percentage points.

Background 
Appearing on ballot in the 2020 California elections on November 3, 2020, the proposed state constitutional amendment was originally introduced as California Assembly Constitutional Amendment No. 6 (ACA 6) by Assemblymember Kevin McCarty in January 2019. ACA 6 passed the California State Assembly by a vote of 54-19 on September 5, 2019, and was approved by the California State Senate by a vote of 28-9 on June 24, 2020. After being put on the ballot, ACA 6 was given the ballot designation of Proposition 17.

Under California law, there is a distinction between probation and parole. Probation is the part of the criminal sentence, and allows those with felonies to finish their sentence outside of the prison. Parole begins upon release from prison when their sentence ends. As of July 2020, the Constitution of California allows someone on probation to vote, but prohibits people on parole from voting until their parole is completed. The effect of Proposition 17 is that all individuals on probation or parole are allowed to vote.

Voting rights in other states 

Reference:

Support 
ACA 6 was co-sponsored by #Cut50, All of Us or None, American Civil Liberties Union of California, Anti-Recidivism Coalition, Californians United for a Responsible Budget, Initiate Justice, League of Women Voters of California, Legal Services for Prisoners with Children, People Over Profits San Diego, Secretary of State Alex Padilla, Vote Allies, White People 4 Black Lives.  It was also supported by 118 organizations and local governments.    The official Argument in Favor was submitted by Carol Moon Goldberg, President of the League of Women Voters of California, Jay Jordan, executive director of Californians for Public Safety, and Assemblymember Kevin McCarty.

Political endorsements 
 Alice B. Toklas LGBTQ Democratic Club 
 Beverly Hill Democratic Club 
 Black Women Organizing for Political Action 
California Democratic Party 
 California Young Democrats 
 Clairemont Democratic Club 
Democratic Socialists of America - Los Angeles 
Democratic Socialists of America - Orange County 
 Democratic Socialists of America - San Diego 
 Democratic Socialists of America - Santa Cruz 
 Democratic Socialists of America - Silicon Valley 
 East Bay Young Democrats 
 Green Party of California 
Harvey Milk LGBTQ Democratic Club 
 Libertarian Party of California 
 Los Angeles County Democratic Party 
 Peace and Freedom Party 
Pilipino American Los Angeles Democrats
 Richmond Progressive Alliance 
 Sacramento County Democratic Party 
 San Diego Democrats for Equality 
 San Francisco Eastern Neighborhoods Democratic Club 
San Francisco Green Party 
 San Francisco Women's Political Committee 
 San Mateo County Democratic Party 
 Santa Barbara County Democratic Party 
 Santa Clara County Libertarian Party 
 Silicon Valley Stonewall Democrats 
 United Democratic Club 
 Valley Grassroots for Democracy 
 Ventura County Democratic Party 
 West Hollywood Democratic Club

Union endorsements 
 AFSCME California 
 California Federation of Teachers 
 California Labor Federation 
 SEIU California State Council 
 SEIU-UHW West

Newspaper editorials

Opposition 
ACA 6 was opposed by Election Integrity Project California, Inc. The official Argument Against was submitted by Harriet Salarno, Founder of Crime Victims United of California, Jim Nielsen, retired Chairman of the California Board of Prison Terms, and Ruth Weiss, Vice President of the Election Integrity Project California.

Newspaper editorials

Polling 
In order to pass, it needs a simple majority (>50%).

Results

Notes

References 

2020 California ballot propositions
Right of felons to vote
Parole in the United States
Criminal penalty ballot measures in the United States